This is a list of Canadian films which were released in 2008:

See also
 2008 in Canada
 2008 in Canadian television

External links
Feature Films Released In 2008 With Country of Origin Canada at IMDb
Canada's Top Ten for 2008 (lists of top ten features and shorts, selected in a process administered by TIFF)
 List of 2008 box office number-one films in Canada

2008
 
Canada